Zeuchthiscus is a genus of prehistoric ray finned fish that lived in Australia  during the Early Triassic Period. It is believed to have been a nektonic omnivore. Closely related fish had a wide distribution in the northern hemisphere.

See also
 List of prehistoric bony fish

References

External links
 Mikko's Phylogeny Archive entry on "†Perleidiformes"
 The Paleobiology Database entry on "Zeuchthiscus"
 A Compendium of Fossil Marine Animal Genera: "Class Osteichthyes"

Prehistoric ray-finned fish genera
Early Triassic fish
Prehistoric neopterygii
Prehistoric fish of Australia